Benjamin O. Fordham is a political scientist at Binghamton University.

Education

Benjamin Fordham graduated from Edmund A. Walsh School of Foreign Service in Georgetown University in 1988 with a B.S. in foreign service. He received Masters in Government in University of North Carolina at Chapel Hill in 1990 and subsequently Ph.D. in 1994.

Career
Fordham was a postdoctoral fellow in Center of International Studies, a research center in Princeton University in 1995. He joined SUNY Albany in 1996 as an assistant professor in political science. He served as visiting associate professor in Harvard University in 2002. He left Albany in 2004 and now teaches in Binghamton University. He was a Henry Alfred Kissinger Scholar in Foreign Policy and International Relations in the John W. Kluge Center, Library of Congress in 2010.

Works

External links
 Curriculum Vitae
 Personal Website

American political scientists
Walsh School of Foreign Service alumni
University of North Carolina at Chapel Hill alumni
Binghamton University faculty
State University of New York faculty
Year of birth missing (living people)
Living people